A payment bond is a surety bond posted by a contractor to guarantee that its subcontractors and material suppliers on the project will be paid.  They are required in contracts over $35,000 with the Federal Government and must be 100% of the contract value.  They are often required in conjunction with performance bonds.

References

Sureties